Gordon Ladd Eaton (born November 28, 1939), known as Gordi Eaton, is an American alpine skier. He competed in the men's downhill at the 1960 Winter Olympics. Eaton is a Middlebury College Class of 1962 graduate, and competed on the school's alpine ski team.

Eaton married Karen Budge, a former alpine ski racer. They reside in Middlebury, Vermont and co-own a restaurant in Lincoln, New Hampshire, in the White Mountains near Loon Mountain and Cannon Mountain ski areas.

References

External links
 
 Gordon "Gordi" Eaton at Middlebury College Athletics

1939 births
Living people
American male alpine skiers
Olympic alpine skiers of the United States
Alpine skiers at the 1960 Winter Olympics
People from Littleton, New Hampshire
Middlebury College alumni